"Believe" is a single by Staind, the first from their sixth studio album, The Illusion of Progress.

Despite only peaking at #83 on the Billboard Hot 100, the single was a success on the rock charts, peaking at #4 on the Mainstream Rock Tracks, and becoming their third #1 hit on the Modern Rock Tracks, after "It's Been Awhile" and So Far Away". "Believe" stayed at #1 for three weeks on the Modern Rock Tracks.

The song was used in a video highlighting the 2008 College Football Season on ESPN and in the 2008 WWE Tribute to the Troops special.

Music video
The music video for "Believe" was directed by Christopher Sims. It features a man who has left his girlfriend in order to find himself. However, she soon leaves as well, presumably to find him. The man travels through the Midwest and ends up somewhere in the West Coast. Aaron Lewis is the only member of the band in the video. Lewis is seen walking down the beach that the man ends up finding. The music video for "All I Want" picks up the story from there.

Charts

References

2008 singles
Staind songs
Rock ballads
2008 songs
Roadrunner Records singles
Atlantic Records singles
Songs written by Aaron Lewis
Song recordings produced by Johnny K
Songs written by Mike Mushok